Samiulla Khan was an Indian politician. He was a Member of Parliament, representing Madhya Pradesh in the Rajya Sabha the upper house of India's Parliament representing the Indian National Congress.

References

Rajya Sabha members from Madhya Pradesh
Indian National Congress politicians
1899 births
1967 deaths
20th-century Indian politicians
Indian National Congress politicians from Madhya Pradesh